The men's 10,000 metres at the 2010 African Championships in Athletics were held on July 28.

Results

External links
Results

10000
10,000 metres at the African Championships in Athletics